Cornelis Eliza Bertus Bremekamp (7 February 1888, in Dordrecht – 21 December 1984) was a Dutch botanist.

He received his education at the University of Utrecht, and performed as a botanical researcher in Indonesia and South Africa. In South Africa he collaborated with German botanist Herold Georg Wilhelm Johannes Schweickerdt (1903–1977).

From 1924 to 1931 he was a professor at Transvaal University in Pretoria, where he conducted studies of the genus Pavetta. During this time period he collected plants from northern Transvaal, Rhodesia, and Mozambique. A portion of his career was spent at the herbarium in Utrecht, where he specialized in studies of Rubiaceae and Acanthaceae.

Eponymy

Bremekampia (Acanthaceae)

Batopedina (Rubiaceae)

Toddaliopsis bremekampii (Rutaceae)

Written works 
 "A revision of the South African species of Pavetta", 1929
 Sciaphyllum, genus novum Acanthacearum, 1940
 "Materials for a monograph of the Strobilanthinae (Acanthaceae)", 1944
 "Notes on the Acanthaceae of Java", 1948
 "A preliminary survey of the Ruelliinae (Acanthaceae) of the Malay Archipelago and New Guinea", 1948
 "The African species of Oldenlandia L Sensu Hiern et K. Schumann", 1952
 "A revision of the Malaysian Nelsonieae (Scrophulariaceae)", 1955
 "The Thunbergia species of the Malesian area", 1955.
 "Remarks on the position, the delimitation and the subdivision of the Rubiaceae", 1966.

References 
 JSTOR Plant Science Bremekamp, Cornelis Eliza Bertus (1888–1984) – biography

1888 births
1984 deaths
20th-century Dutch botanists
Dutch expatriates in South Africa
People from Dordrecht
Utrecht University alumni